The Watertown Daily Times is a newspaper published six days a week, Tuesday through Sunday, in Watertown, New York. It provides coverage of Jefferson County, Lewis County, St. Lawrence County and Oswego County.  It was founded in 1861 and is owned by the Johnson family of Watertown.

For years, the Times was the smallest newspaper in the country to have its own Washington, D.C., bureau. The Times covers its geographically expansive coverage area through a network of bureaus and shared resources with its sister newspapers. In addition to Watertown, the newspaper has news-gathering operations in Lowville, Canton, Massena and Malone.

The Times produces a number of publications, including the monthly NNY Business magazine and seasonal NNY Living magazine, the Journal and Republican of Lowville, the Courier-Observer of Massena and Potsdam and the Oswego County News, all zoned, weekly news section.

All of these publications are represented online by the Times' NNY360 brand.

The Times is the flagship publication of the Johnson Newspaper Corporation, which owns newspapers across New York. In addition to the Times and its weeklies, it owns The Malone Telegram, The Daily News of Batavia, The Register-Star of Hudson, The Daily Mail of Catskill and the weekly Livingston County News of Geneseo.

The Times also spawned the WWNY radio and television stations. The television station still has the WWNY-TV calls, while the radio station is now WTNY.

References

External links

Daily newspapers published in New York (state)
Newspapers established in 1861
1861 establishments in New York (state)
Watertown, New York